Michael von der Schulenburg (full name: Michael Sergius Graf von der Schulenburg; born 16 October 1948 in Munich, Germany) is a former senior German diplomat with the United Nations and with the Organization for Security and Cooperation in Europe (OSCE). Between 2005 and 2012 he worked at the rank of Assistant Secretary-General in UN peace missions in Iraq and Sierra Leone.

Life and career 
Michael von der Schulenburg is a descendant of the ‘Russian Line’ of the old German noble family of the von der Schulenburg. He earned degrees from the Free University in West Berlin, London School of Economics, and the École Nationale d’Administration.

He worked for the UN for 30 years – in assignments in Haiti, Pakistan, Afghanistan, Iran, Iraq and Sierra Leone, among others. When serving at the United Nations Integrated Peacebuilding Office in Sierra Leone (UNIPSIL) as the highest UN representative in Sierra Leone (Executive Representative of the Secretary-General – ERSG), he came into conflict with the government over the implementation of the Lomé Peace Agreement, police arming and the forthcoming presidential elections. In 2012, he was asked to leave the country.

Since his retirement from the UN, Schulenburg worked as an advisor and as a publicist. In 2017, he published his book On Building Peace – Rescuing the Nation-State and Saving the United Nations.

In 2020, Sierra Leonean President Julius Maada Bio awarded Schulenburg the highest honour of the country in recognition of his contributions to maintain peace in Sierra Leone, and made him Grand Commander of the Order of the Republic (GCOR).

Varies 
In 2001 Schulenburg accused Pino Arlacchi, the Director General of the UN in Vienna and of the UN Office for Drug Control and Crime Prevention, in a confidential letter that was later leaked to the press, that the office under Arlacchi's leadership suffered from fear, intimidation and a general lack of transparency. An official UN investigation later confirmed the accused mismanagement practices.

In 2009 Schulenburg put himself at risk in Sierra Leone to save 22 youths of the opposition from being lynched by a large crowd that was attacking the opposition’s headquarters.

Publications 
(2017). Building Peace – Rescuing the Nation-State and Saving the United Nations. Amsterdam University Press.

References

External links 
CV on michael-von-der-schulenburg.com
2009 Presentation to the UN Security Council

Living people
1948 births
German officials of the United Nations
20th-century German diplomats
Free University of Berlin alumni
Alumni of the London School of Economics
École nationale d'administration alumni
Organization for Security and Co-operation in Europe